Results from Norwegian football in 1927.

Class A of local association leagues
Class A of local association leagues (kretsserier) is the predecessor of a national league competition.

 
1In the following season, local associations Hamar og omegn and Opland merged to form Oplandene.
2In the following season, Nordre Østerdalen local association changed name to Nord-Østerdal.

Norwegian Cup

Final

National team

Sources:

References

 
Seasons in Norwegian football